Tris(acetonitrile)cyclopentadienylruthenium hexafluorophosphate is an organoruthenium compound with the formula [(C5H5)Ru(NCCH3)3]PF6, abbreviated [CpRu(NCMe)3]PF6.  It is a yellow-brown solid that is soluble in polar organic solvents.  The compound is a salt consisting of the hexafluorophosphate anion and the cation [CpRu(NCMe)3]+. In coordination chemistry, it is used as a source of RuCp+ for further derivitization. In organic synthesis, it is a homogeneous catalyst. It enables C-C bond formation and promotes cycloadditions.  The cyclopentadienyl ligand (Cp) is bonded in an η5 manner to the Ru(II) center.

Preparation
The title complex is synthesized in two steps from the (benzene)ruthenium dichloride dimer.  In the first step, the Cp− group is installed using cyclopentadienylthallium: 
[(C6H6)RuCl2]2  +  2 TlCp  +  2 NH4PF6   →   2 [Cp(C6H6)Ru]PF6  +  2 TlCl  +  2 NH4Cl
The second step entails photochemical displacement  of the benzene ligand, which is replaced by three equivalents of acetonitrile (MeCN):
[Cp(C6H6)Ru]PF6  +  3 MeCN   →    [CpRu(NCMe)3]PF6  +  C6H6

References

Organoruthenium compounds
Cyclopentadienyl complexes
Hexafluorophosphates
Half sandwich compounds
Nitriles
Ruthenium(II) compounds